Francesca Ciardi (born 26 July 1954) is an Italian film actress.

She was one of four actors whom the Italian police believed had been murdered in the making of the 1980 horror film Cannibal Holocaust. The film was considered so realistic, that shortly after the film was released, its director Ruggero Deodato was arrested for murder. The actors had signed contracts to stay out of the media for a year in order to fuel rumours that the film was a snuff movie. The court was only convinced that they were alive when the contracts were cancelled and the actors appeared on a television show as proof.

In 2014, after over twenty years out of the film business, Ciardi returned to film in Spencer Hawken's zero budget movie Death Walks.

Filmography
Cannibal Holocaust (1980) - Faye
The Tunnel (1980)
Caccia al ladro d'autore (1985) (TV series)
La ragazza dei lilla (1985)
Mosca addio (1987)
Safari (1991)
Death Walks (2016)

See also
Carl Gabriel Yorke
Perry Pirkanen
Luca Barbareschi

References

External links

Francesca Ciardi at the Chiller Theatre Expo 2010

Italian film actresses
1954 births
Living people
Place of birth missing (living people)
20th-century Italian actresses